Marina Erakovic and Michaëlla Krajicek won in the final 7–6(7–4), 6–0, against Mădălina Gojnea and Monica Niculescu.

Seeds

Draw

Finals

Top half

Bottom half

References

Girls' Doubles
US Open, 2004 Girls' Doubles